Øyvind Storflor (born 18 December 1979) is a Norwegian former professional footballer. With 421 top division appearances, Storflor has made the fifth-highest number of appearances in Eliteserien.

Club career
Storflor was born in Trondheim. He made his debut for Rosenborg BK in 1999. In January 2003, Storflor returned to Rosenborg for NOK 1,000,000.

He came on a free transfer to Strømsgodset before the 2009 season. Winning the Norwegian Cup with the club in 2011 and Eliteserien in 2013, he stepped down to play for Ranheim in the 2017 season. However, the club achieved promotion from OBOS-ligaen through the play-offs the same year and has played in the top division since 2018. After the 2019 season Storflor decided to retire for football.

International career
Storflor has four caps for the Norwegian national team. His first three caps all came in a pre-season tournament in January 2005. On 10 October 2014, he was subbed into the World Cup qualifying match versus Slovenia.

Career statistics

Honours

Club
Rosenborg
Tippeligaen: 1999, 2000, 2003, 2004, 2006
Norwegian Cup: 2003

Strømsgodset
Tippeligaen: 2013
Norwegian Cup: 2010

Individual
Eliteserien Top assist provider: 2011, 2012,  2013

References

External links
 
 

Living people
1979 births
Footballers from Trondheim
Association football forwards
Association football midfielders
Norwegian footballers
Norway international footballers
Rosenborg BK players
Byåsen Toppfotball players
Moss FK players
Strømsgodset Toppfotball players
Eliteserien players
Norwegian First Division players